{
  "type": "FeatureCollection",
  "features": [
    {
      "type": "Feature",
      "properties": {},
      "geometry": {
        "type": "Point",
        "coordinates": [
          -122.704679,
          49.132953
        ]
      }
    }
  ]
}Clayton Community Centre is a community recreation center located in Surrey, British Columbia, Canada.  The building is the largest largest Passive House green building in Canada  The building uses up to 90% less energy than similar buildings.

The facility contains music studios, a indoor cycling studio, weight room, gymnasiums, demonstration kitchen, preschool, woodworking shop and demo kitchen as well as a 14,000 square foot branch of Surrey Libraries

References

Buildings and structures in Surrey, British Columbia
Sports venues completed in 2016